St. Michael's College, Cherthala, is a general degree college located in Cherthala, Alappuzha district, Kerala. It was established in the year 1967. The college is affiliated with Kerala University. This college offers different courses in arts, commerce and science.

Departments

Science

Physics
Chemistry
Mathematics
Botany
Zoology

Arts and Commerce

Malayalam
English
Hindi
Economics
Physical Education
Commerce

Vocational

Tourism
Software Development

Accreditation
The college is  recognized by the University Grants Commission (UGC).

Notable alumni
 Rajan P. Dev, South Indian Film Actor

References

External links
http://www.stmichaelscherthala.edu.in/

Universities and colleges in Alappuzha district
Educational institutions established in 1967
1967 establishments in Kerala
Arts and Science colleges in Kerala
Colleges affiliated to the University of Kerala